David Robinson (14 July 1948 – April 2016) was an English professional footballer who played as a central defender. He played nearly 300 games in the Football League for Birmingham City and Walsall, before joining Southern League club Tamworth as player-manager. He later managed Oldbury United.

Robinson died in April 2016 at the age of 67.

Honours
Birmingham City
Second Division runners-up: 1971–72

References

1948 births
2016 deaths
Footballers from Birmingham, West Midlands
English footballers
Association football central defenders
Birmingham City F.C. players
Walsall F.C. players
Tamworth F.C. players
English Football League players
English football managers
Tamworth F.C. managers